"The Movies" is an episode of the British comedy television series The Goodies.

This episode is also known as "The British Film Industry" and "The Black & White, Western, Epic Movie" as well as "BBC" and "The Choices of Film Creation".

As with other episodes in the series, this episode was written by members of The Goodies, with songs and music by Bill Oddie.

Award
The Goodies won the Silver Rose in 1975 for this episode at the Festival Rose d'Or, held in Montreux, Switzerland.

Plot
After complaining about the decline of the British film industry, the trio purchase Pinetree Studios (for £25) in the hope of making some good films.  They then fire all the directors, whom they consider to be making films which are either "very boring or extremely pretentious in many cases both" and decide to make a film themselves.

Their attempt to remake Macbeth with less violence and more family interest is a complete failure, and leads to the three Goodies falling out with each other and attempting to make their own films, separately. Tim wants to make a Biblical epic — while Graeme wants to make a violent Western, and Bill wants to make a silent black and white comedy (believing that to do this he has to paint everything monochrome, and not talk).  Bill comments: "Buster Keaton must have spent three weeks painting the whole town black and white. And then a ruddy great building falls on him, and he doesn't make a sound."

Arguing over which type of film should be made, Graeme comments to Tim: "At least I can act which is more than I can say for some people present."  Feeling hurt, Tim asks: "And what's that supposed to mean?"  to which Graeme replies: "Well lets face it darling, you're no Glenda Jackson are you?"

Later, they start filming in an overcrowded studio outside, but wherever Tim, Bill and the other casts and film crews go, they keep running into Graeme's film set which is bigger than the others, as well as running into each other's sets. Bill joins up with his favourite legendary comedians Charlie Chaplin, Buster Keaton and Laurel and Hardy. Then the battle of the Goodies begins when Tim's film crew bump into Graeme's film crew and all three extras fight alongside the Goodies.  But the fight doesn't go well as the Goodies get hurt by their own extras.  So they flee around the studios arguing and running about in the theatre.  When the Goodies reunite, on stage, they are still arguing - until the huge word "The End" appears to drag the Goodies up in the air as they call for help.

Cultural references
 Elstree Studios and Pinewood Studios
 Silent films
 Western movies
 Samson and Delilah
 Epic films
 Keystone Kops
 Buster Keaton
 Charlie Chaplin
 Laurel and Hardy
 The Sound of Music
 Macbeth
 Mae West
 Frankenstein's Monster
 Death In Venice

Notes
This is the first episode where Tim wears his iconic Union Jack waistcoat. This look would remain his staple signature costume throughout the series until its cancellation.
 The Spanish town seen in the episode was a standing exterior set at Pinewood Studios. It can also be seen in the film Carry On Abroad.
 Among the directors sacked by Tim are Franco Zeffirelli, Stanley Kubrick, Ken Russell, Sam Peckinpah, Federico Fellini and Andy Warhol.
 Bill Oddie has compared the middle sequence in which the Goodies view a rough edit of their film-making efforts to "funny movies you make with your family on Boxing Day".

DVD and VHS releases

This episode has been released on DVD.

References

 The Complete Goodies — Robert Ross, B T Batsford, London, 2000
 The Goodies Rule OK — Robert Ross, Carlton Books Ltd, Sydney, 2006
 From Fringe to Flying Circus — 'Celebrating a Unique Generation of Comedy 1960-1980' — Roger Wilmut, Eyre Methuen Ltd, 1980
 The Goodies Episode Summaries — Brett Allender
 The Goodies — Fact File — Matthew K. Sharp

External links
 The Goodies — "The Movies" - at IMDb
(the episode is listed under the title of "Movies" on IMDb)

The Goodies (series 5) episodes
1975 British television episodes